Muhammad Ibrahim Habsade ( November 10, 1952 – January 24, 2015) was a Somali politician and rebel soldier of the Rahanweyn Resistance Army. He was Minister of Land and Air Transport and Minister of Agriculture in the Somali Transitional Federal Government.

Life and career
Mohamed Ibrahim Habsade was born in Toosweyne village in the Berdale district of Bay region. He served in the military of Siad Barre and was located in the northern part of Somalia, mainly in Hargeisa and Buro. He follows the Sufi sect of Islam, particularly Sheikh Banani Tariqah. He was among the leaders who laid the foundations of Rahanweyn Resistance Army (RRA), established in Jafay in the outskirts of Berdale district late 1995. He died on January 24, 2015.

Background of conflict
Prior to Aideed's invasion of Baidoa on 17 September 1995, the Leysan sub-clan of the Rahanweyn clan were almost all the employees of the UNOSOM and the relief Service Organisation. The Al- Ahli Company, run by Sharif Hassan Sheikh Adan whose mother is from Leysan, had monopoly power in signing contract with the Relief Service Organisation whıch were stationed in Baidoa to offer aid to the victims of the famine which hit the area between Juba and Shabelle.
This made the other Rahanweyn subclans feel marginalised and prompted frequent clashes between the Leysan and the Harin, the Jiron, and eventually the Eelay in September 1995.

The Leysan captured the Elaay inhabited town of Buurhakaba. The Eelay elders resorted to Mohamed Farah Aideed and asked him to attack Baidoa. As a result of this Baidoa fell in the hands of Aideed on a Sunday morning on 17 September 1995. Most of the Rahanwein clans initially welcomed Aideed  The Elaay sided with Aideed. The ousted leaders of the Leysan including Habsade resorted to armed resistance to free Baidoa from Aideed, and together with other Rahanweyn politicians founded RRA in Jaffay and appointed by colonel Hassan Mohamed Nor Shaatigaduud.

Opposition
Habsade elected  the thirty  leader of RRA,. Therefore, they viewed that without the help of Rahanwein subclans, they will not achieve their goals of liberating . As well as Hasan Muhammad Nur Shatigadud of the Harin subclan elected to the leadership of RRA. This move won the support he expected from other subclans, but after the liberation of Baidoa in 1999, his clan held him responsible for their third position of RRA leadership.

In 2002, Habsade, along with Sheikh Aden Madobe, who is from the Hadame clan, opposed Shatigudud when he declared himself the president of the short-lived semi-autonomous government of south western. Habsade and Sheikh Aden Madowe then clashed a few years later, ensuing several fights within Baidoa city. Habsade's fighters were  getting help from an ally named Mohamed Nur Saraonsor, another Hadame clan member. They eventually ousted the militias loyal to both Sheikh Aden Madowe and Shatigadud. Habsade opposed the relocation of the TFG to Baidoa and eventually allied himself with the Mogadishu warlords.

References

2015 deaths
1952 births
Government ministers of Somalia
Members of the Transitional Federal Parliament
People from Bay, Somalia
Deaths from diabetes